Islam is a minority religion in the Netherlands Antilles. There are about 2,500 Muslims in the Islands, 1000 of which are in the Caribbean Netherlands, or 0.31% of the population. Most Muslims are emigrants from Lebanon, Syria and Suriname.

History 
Muslims began to reach the islands during colonial times as workers, from African countries then from the Indian subcontinent. Then there was a wave of Muslims coming from Lebanon, Syria and Iraq as well as some indigenous people who converted to Islam. In 1982 there were about 2000 Muslims.

Islamic centers 
The majority of the Islam community is located on Curaçao where is the only mosque: Omar bin Al-Khattab Mosque, with its imam Sheikh Yakubu Mohammed. There are other Islamic centers including:
 Bonaire Islamic Center, Kaya Hanchi Amboina, Bonaire
 Curaçao Islamic Center, Weg Naar Welgelegen # 6, Island of Curaçao, Willemstad
 Sint Maarten Islamic Center, Puma Road 26, Philipsburg
 Muslim Gemeente Curaçao, Weg Naar Welgelegen 6, Curaçao, Willemstad
 Muslim Student Association, University Of Sint Eustatius School Of Medicine, Oranjestad, ST EUSTATIUS
 Sint Eustatius Islamic Foundation, Oranjestad, Sint Eustatius

See also 

 Islam in the Netherlands
 Islam in Aruba

References 

Dutch Antillean culture
Netherlands Antilles
Islam in the Kingdom of the Netherlands
Netherland Antilles
Netherland Antilles